Herresbach is a municipality in the district of Mayen-Koblenz, Rhineland-Palatinate, Germany.

References

External links
Herresbach 

Mayen-Koblenz